Kabarondo is a town in the Republic of Rwanda.

Location
Kabarondo is located in Kayonza District, Eastern Province. It is in the southeastern part of Rwanda, along the main road (RN3) from Kigali in Rwanda, to Nyakasanza, in Tanzania. The coordinates of Kabarondo are:2°00'38.0"S, 30°33'27.0"E (Latitude:-2.010556; Longitude:30.557500).

Points of interest
The following points of interest are found in or near Kabarondo:

 Offices of Kabarondo Town Council
 Kabarondo Central Market
 Kabarondo Boys Centre - Established in 2010 by the Streets Ahead Children's Centre Association and the Property Professionals Breakfast Club SACCA.
 Kabarondo Vocational Training Centre
 Kabarondo Taxi Park

See also
 List of banks in Rwanda

References

External links
 Business As Usual: Clementine's Climb From Farmer To Leader
 Kabarondo Traders Warned On Tax Fraud

Eastern Province, Rwanda